Erichthonius Discovered by the Daughters of Cecrops is a large 1617 oil on canvas painting by Jacob Jordaens, now in the Royal Museum of Fine Arts, Antwerp.

The artist was then aged only 24 and still heavily influenced by Peter Paul Rubens, who had produced a version of the same scene in 1616. The work shows Hephaestus's son Erichthonius of Athens being discovered by the daughters of Cecrops I, derived from Ovid's Metamorphoses and the Library of Pseudo-Apollodorus. Jordaens returned to the same subject in 1640 in a work now in Vienna's Kunsthistorisches Museum.

Sources
Jordaens, la gloire d'Anvers, collection Beaux-Arts, Petit Palais, September 2013

1617 paintings
Paintings in the collection of the Royal Museum of Fine Arts Antwerp
Paintings depicting Greek myths
Paintings by Jacob Jordaens
Birds in art
Dogs in art